USS LST-622 was a United States Navy LST-542-class tank landing ship in commission from 1944 to 1946.

Construction and commissioning
LST-622 was laid down on 15 March 1944 at Seneca, Illinois, by the Chicago Bridge and Iron Company. She was launched on 8 June 1944, and commissioned on 26 June 1944.

World War II service
During World War II, LST-622 was assigned to the Asiatic-Pacific Theater and participated in the Lingayen Gulf landing, January 1945, and the assault and occupation of Okinawa Gunto, from March through June 1945.

She was decommissioned on 11 January 1946.

Awards and honors
LST-622 earned two battle stars for World War II service.

References

External links
LST Story Film: the building and launch of LST-542-class tank landing ships during World War II.

LST-542-class tank landing ships
World War II amphibious warfare vessels of the United States
Ships built in Seneca, Illinois
1944 ships